Elisha Yaffe is a comedian, actor and writer. He has appeared in television shows including Better Call Saul, The Newsroom, Mad Men, Southland, Up All Night, The New Normal and CSI: NY and voiced the characters of Jimmy Olsen and B'dg on DC Nation Shorts's Tales of Metropolis and Super-Pets.

He has co-created webseries, including Downers Grove, Minor Stars and Remember When. He has appeared in commercials for Mike's Hard Lemonade, Time Warner Cable, Samsung, Wendy's, McDonald's, Nintendo 3DS, Progressive and Hanes.

Life and career
Yaffe is from Amherst, Massachusetts, where he was a founding member of the Valley Arts Project, a non-profit dedicated to supporting the development of young artists. Yaffe organized the project's Valley Arts Festival, which featured performances by up and coming artists in the Pioneer Valley area, including a then-unknown Sonya Kitchell. He is a graduate of Emerson College.

After college, he formed Sorry, Dad Productions with Michael Blaiklock, Dave Horwitz, and Justin Becker. Together they produced the slacker comedy "Downers Grove" for Warner Brothers Studio 2.0. He was named to the Heeb 100 in 2010.

Film and television

References

External links

 

Living people
21st-century American comedians
Emerson College alumni
Writers from Amherst, Massachusetts
1983 births
Comedians from Massachusetts